Richard Henare is a New Zealand former rugby league footballer who played in the 1990s and 2000s. He played at club level for Carlisle, in the Super League for the Warrington Wolves (Heritage No. 941), and the Swinton Lions.

Playing career
Henare began his career playing for Carlisle before joining the Warrington Wolves in 1996. In the 1996 and 1997 seasons he played twenty-four Super League matches for the Warrington Wolves.

Richard Henare made his début for Warrington Wolves on Friday 5 April 1996, and he played his last match for Warrington Wolves on Friday 11 July 1997, he was Warrington Wolves' leading try-scorer in 1996's Super League I with 17-tries.

He later played for Swinton Lions before being released in 2000 after receiving a twelve-month ban for testing positive for cannabis.

References

Living people
New Zealand rugby league players
Warrington Wolves players
Swinton Lions players
Carlisle RLFC players
Rugby league wingers
Year of birth missing (living people)